Yehor Volodymyrovych Prokopenko (born 24 May 1998) is a Ukrainian professional footballer who plays as a left back for Ukrainian club Obolon Kyiv.

References

External links
 Profile on Obolon Kyiv official website
 

1998 births
Living people
Footballers from Kyiv
Ukrainian footballers
Association football defenders
FC Obolon-Brovar Kyiv players
FC Obolon-2 Kyiv players
Ukrainian First League players
Ukrainian Second League players